Bert Kinnear (24 October 1923 – 10 January 2011) was a British swimmer. He competed in the men's 100 metre backstroke at the 1948 Summer Olympics.

References

External links

1923 births
2011 deaths
British male swimmers
Olympic swimmers of Great Britain
Swimmers at the 1948 Summer Olympics
People from Arbroath
Commonwealth Games medallists in swimming
Commonwealth Games bronze medallists for Scotland
Swimmers at the 1950 British Empire Games
Sportspeople from Angus, Scotland
British male backstroke swimmers
Medallists at the 1950 British Empire Games
Scottish male swimmers